Sniffies is an interactive, map-based hookup web app for gay, bisexual, and bicurious men.

History
The website was launched in 2018 by founder Blake Gallagher in Seattle, Washington. The name "Sniffies" came from an earlier website that was used for trading underwear, but now refers more to "sniffing out what’s around" according to their marketing officer.

See also

 Comparison of online dating services
 List of LGBT social networking services

References

Internet properties established in 2018
LGBT culture
Same sex online dating